The following is a list of massacres that have occurred in Afghanistan (numbers may be approximate):

Durrani Empire and Anglo-Afghan War

Khalq communist rule

Soviet-Afghan War

Civil war

War in Afghanistan (2001–2021)

Note: According to the United Nations, 75–80% of civilian casualties in the War in Afghanistan were caused by the Taliban and other "resistance" groups from 2009 to 2011. This list is incomplete and does not represent these official figures properly.

Taliban era

References

Afghanistan
Massacres

Masscres